Cosmocampus coccineus is a species of pipefish from the family Syngnathidae. It is found in the eastern Pacific Ocean from Bahía de Banderas in Mexico south to Bahía de la Independencia, southern Peru, and in waters off the Galapagos Islands. It is an ovoviviparous breeder in which the male carries the eggs in a brood pouch which is located under his tail. C. coccineus has been regarded as a subspecies of C. arctus, along with C. heraldi.

References

coccineus
Taxa named by Earl Stannard Herald
Fish described in 1940